Catty-Cornered is a 1966 Tom and Jerry cartoon directed by Abe Levitow and produced by Chuck Jones.

Plot
Jerry lives in the wall between two apartments, one where Tom lives and the other where Lightning lives. Lightning and Tom show that they are out to get him.

Jerry screws up his courage and steals two of Tom's whiskers. He is attacked but tricks Tom into smacking Lightning. He punches back and both cats assume Jerry is a "super-mouse". Jerry trips an arrow aimed at a cheese wheel, it strips the other cat of its fur. Tom ends up furless as well. An armed conflict escalates when Jerry directs the cat's fire at each other.

Tom rolls a lighted firework into Jerry's hole, and Jerry rolls it back out under Tom. Tom hears it hissing under him and raises himself such that he is dazed, but not hurt, by the explosion. Both cats then arm a hand grenade and throw it into the mouse's hole, but they hit each other and return to their owners. The two grenades go back and forth until the explosion of them occurs in each of their users' hands, damaging the almost entire wall. Both cats give up and they move on going to Paris, while Jerry whistles and follows them.

Crew
Animation: Tom Ray, Dick Thompson, Ben Washam, Ken Harris, & Don Towsley.
Layouts: Don Morgan
Backgrounds: Hal Ashmead
Design Consultant: Maurice Noble
Vocal Effects: Mel Blanc & June Foray
Production Manager: Earl Jonas
Story: John Dunn, Chuck Jones & Michael Maltese
Music: Carl Brandt
Production Supervised by Les Goldman
Produced by Chuck Jones
Directed by Abe Levitow & Chuck Jones

References

External links

1966 films
1966 short films
1966 animated films
Films directed by Abe Levitow
Animated films without speech
Tom and Jerry short films
1960s American animated films
1966 comedy films
Metro-Goldwyn-Mayer short films
Metro-Goldwyn-Mayer animated short films
MGM Animation/Visual Arts short films
1960s English-language films